Brebes may refer to several places in Indonesia:
 Brebes Regency, a regency in Central Java
 Brebes District, a district in Brebes Regency
 Kelurahan Brebes, an administrative village (kelurahan) in Brebes District